The Shire of Bowen was a local government area in the North Queensland region of Queensland, Australia.

The Shire's economy was based on tropical agriculture, fishing, tourism and coal mining.

History
The Shire of Bowen had its origins in two entities:
 the Borough of Bowen which was constituted as a municipality on 7 August 1863 under the Municipalities Act 1858 to provide local government within the urban area of Bowen
 the Wangaratta Division which was created on 11 November 1879 as one of 74 divisions around Queensland under the Divisional Boards Act 1879 to provide local government in the rural areas surrounding Bowen

With the passage of the Local Authorities Act 1902, the Borough of Bowen became the Town of Bowen and Wangaratta Division became the Shire of Wangaratta on 31 March 1903.

On 2 April 1960, the Town of Bowen was abolished, and merged into the Shire of Wangaratta, which was renamed Shire of Bowen.

On 15 March 2008, under the Local Government (Reform Implementation) Act 2007 passed by the Parliament of Queensland on 10 August 2007, the Shire of Bowen merged with the Shire of Whitsunday to form the Whitsunday Region.

Towns and localities
The Shire of Bowen included the following settlements:

 Bowen
 Collinsville
 Binbee
 Bogie
 Brisk Bay
 Gumlu
 Guthalungra
 Inveroona
 Merinda
 Mount Coolon
 Mount Wyatt
 Newlands
 Queens Beach
 Scottville
 Springlands

Chairmen and mayors

Mayor of Borough/Town of Bowen
 1908: Malcolm Gillies 
 1927: T. B. Edwards 
 (10 years): John Edward Kelly

Mayor of Bowen Shire
1997-2008: Mike Brunker

Population

References

External links
 

Former local government areas of Queensland
1879 establishments in Australia
2008 disestablishments in Australia
Populated places disestablished in 2008